The natural environment, commonly referred to simply as the environment, is all living and non-living things that occur naturally on Earth or some part of it (e.g. the natural environment in a country). This includes complete ecological units that function as natural systems without massive human intervention, including all vegetation, animals, microorganisms, rocks, atmosphere and natural phenomena that occur within their boundaries. And it includes universal natural resources and physical phenomena that lack clear-cut boundaries, such as air, water, and climate, as well as energy, radiation, electric charge, and magnetism, not originating from human activity.

General lists

 List of anti-nuclear groups
 List of Areas of Critical Environmental Concern in Colorado
 List of articles associated with nuclear issues in California
 List of atmospheric dispersion models
 List of California Air Districts
 List of car-free places
 List of climate change initiatives
 List of climate change topics
 List of climate research satellites
 List of coalfields
 List of composting systems
 List of conservation issues
 List of conservation topics
 List of crimes involving radioactive substances
 List of dams and reservoirs
 List of disaster films
 List of environmental agencies in the United States
 List of environmental agreements
 List of environmental dates
 List of environmental degrees
 List of environmental film festivals
 List of environmental films
 List of environmental health hazards
 List of environmental history topics
 List of environmental issues
 List of environmental laws by country
 List of environmental lawsuits
 List of environmental ministries
 List of environmental organizations
 List of environmental research institutes
 List of environmental studies topics
 List of environmental topics
 List of environmental websites
 List of films about nuclear issues
 List of flash floods
 List of forest regions and districts of British Columbia
 List of forest research institutes
 List of forestry ministries
 List of forestry technical schools
 List of forestry universities and colleges
 List of fuel cell vehicles
 List of global sustainability statistics
 List of Green topics
 List of historic schools of forestry
 List of international environmental agreements
 List of Kyoto Protocol signatories
 List of largest oil and gas companies by revenue
 List of largest unfragmented rivers
 List of largest wilderness areas in the United States
 List of low emissions locomotives
 List of March for Science locations
 List of most polluted cities in the world
 List of National Wildlife Refuges at risk from the Deepwater Horizon oil spill
 List of National Wildlife Refuges established for endangered species
 List of natural gas fields
 List of natural gas pipelines
 List of nature centres in Australia
 List of nuclear close calls
 List of nuclear test sites
 List of nuclear waste treatment technologies
 List of nuclear weapon test locations
 List of nuclear weapons tests
 List of oil and gas fields of the Barents Sea
 List of oil fields
 List of oil pipelines
 List of oil refineries
 List of old growth forests
 List of open-pit mines
 List of parties to the Environmental Modification Convention
 List of periods and events in climate history
 List of populated places affected by the 2010 Haiti earthquake
 List of previously issued tornado emergencies
 List of proposed geoengineering schemes
 List of pseudoscientific water fuel inventions
 List of renewable energy organizations
 List of renewable energy technologies
 List of renewable energy topics by country
 List of renewable resources produced and traded by the United Kingdom
 List of reservoirs by surface area
 List of solid waste treatment technologies
 List of sperm whale strandings
 List of sterile insect technique trials
 List of Superfund sites in the United States
 List of supranational environmental agencies
 List of sustainable agriculture topics
 List of sustainable buildings in Australia
 List of tallest smokestacks in Canada
 List of threatened ecological communities of Western Australia
 List of topics related to global warming
 List of types of formally designated forests
 List of U.S. states by carbon dioxide emissions
 List of United States federal environmental statutes
 List of waste disposal incidents
 List of waste management acronyms
 List of waste management companies
 List of waste management concepts
 List of waste types
 List of waste water treatment technologies
 List of wilderness study areas
 Lists of reservoirs and dams

Lists of countries

 List of countries by carbon dioxide emissions
 List of countries by carbon dioxide emissions per capita
 List of countries by coal production
 List of countries by ecological footprint
 List of countries by electricity consumption
 List of countries by electricity exports
 List of countries by electricity imports
 List of countries by electricity production
 List of countries by electricity production from renewable sources
 List of countries by energy consumption per capita
 List of countries by energy intensity
 List of countries by forest area
 List of countries by freshwater withdrawal
 List of countries by greenhouse gas emissions
 List of countries by greenhouse gas emissions per capita
 List of countries by irrigated land area
 List of countries by natural disaster risk
 List of countries by natural gas consumption
 List of countries by natural gas exports
 List of countries by natural gas imports
 List of countries by natural gas production
 List of countries by natural gas proven reserves
 List of countries by net oil exports
 List of countries by oil consumption
 List of countries by oil exports
 List of countries by oil imports
 List of countries by oil production
 List of countries by percentage of water area
 List of countries by proven oil reserves
 List of countries by recoverable shale gas
 List of countries by total length of pipelines
 List of countries by total primary energy consumption and production
 List of countries by total renewable water resources
 List of oil-producing states
 List of Ramsar Convention contracting parties
 List of states with nuclear weapons

Lists of disasters

 List of environmental disasters
 List of environmental incidents in the fossil fuel industry in Australia
 List of gold mining disasters
 List of man-made disasters
 List of man-made mass chronic poisoning incidents
 List of nuclear and radiation accidents by country
 List of oil spills
 List of pipeline accidents
 List of pipeline accidents in the United States
 List of pipeline accidents in the United States before 1900
 List of pipeline accidents in the United States (1900–1949)
 List of pipeline accidents in the United States (1950–1974)
 List of pipeline accidents in the United States (1975–1999)
 List of pipeline accidents in the United States in the 21st century
 List of power outages
 List of tornado-related deaths at schools
 List of tornadoes causing 100 or more deaths
 Lists of nuclear disasters and radioactive incidents

Lists of emissions into the air

Criteria air contaminants
Flue-gas emissions from fossil-fuel combustion
Motor vehicle emissions
Wildland fire emission

Lists of people

 Heroes of the Environment (2007)
 Heroes of the Environment (2008)
 Heroes of the Environment (2009)
 List of American non-fiction environmental writers
 List of anti-nuclear advocates in Germany
 List of anti-nuclear advocates in the United States
 List of climate scientists
 List of conservationists
 List of environmental killings
 List of environmental engineers
 List of environmental lawyers
 List of environmental philosophers
 List of ministers of climate change
 List of Ministers of Natural Environment of Brazil
 List of ministers of the environment
 List of non-fiction environmental writers
 List of pro-nuclear environmentalists
 List of scientists opposing the mainstream scientific assessment of global warming

Lists of people and organizations
Global 500 Roll of Honour
 List of environment and forest research institutes in India
 List of population concern organizations
 List of rare breed livestock charities

Lists of power stations

 List of coal power stations
 List of conventional hydroelectric power stations
 List of fuel oil power stations
 List of geothermal power stations
 List of largest hydroelectric power stations
 List of largest power stations in the United States
 List of largest power stations in the world
 List of least carbon efficient power stations
 List of natural gas power stations
 List of nuclear power stations
 List of nuclear reactors
 List of offshore wind farms
 List of onshore wind farms
 List of photovoltaic power stations
 List of pumped-storage hydroelectric power stations
 List of run-of-the-river hydroelectric power stations
 List of solar thermal power stations
 List of tidal power stations
 List of wave power stations
 Lists of offshore wind farms by country
 Lists of offshore wind farms by water area
 Lists of wind farms by country

(Many more lists are in :Category:Lists of power stations.)

Lists of publications

 List of Australian environmental books
 List of books about coal mining
 List of books about energy issues
 List of books about nuclear issues
 List of climate change books
 List of environmental books
 List of environmental economics journals
 List of environmental journals
 List of environmental law reviews and journals
 List of environmental periodicals
 List of environmental reports
 List of environmental social science journals
 List of environmental websites
 List of forestry journals
 List of planning journals

Lists of species

 List of endangered species threatened by the Deepwater Horizon oil spill
 List of invasive species
 List of threatened fauna of Michigan
 List of threatened flora of Australia
 List of threatened species of the Philippines
 List of wildlife species at risk
 List of the world's 100 worst invasive species
 Lists of mammals by population
 Rote Liste (German: "Red List")

Lists of terminology
 Air pollution dispersion terminology

Glossaries

 Glossary of climate change
 Glossary of ecology
 Glossary of environmental science
 Glossary of wildfire terms

Indexes

 Index of biodiversity articles
 Index of climate change articles
 Index of conservation articles
 Index of Earth science articles
 Index of energy articles
 Index of fishing articles
 Index of forestry articles
 Index of genetic engineering articles
 Index of meteorology articles
 Index of pesticide articles
 Index of plate tectonics articles
 Index of radiation articles
 Index of recycling articles
 Index of solar energy articles
 Index of sustainability articles
 Index of urban planning articles
 Index of urban studies articles
 Index of environmental articles
 Index of waste management articles

Outlines

 Outline of ecology
 Outline of energy
 Outline of environmental journalism
 Outline of fishing
 Outline of forestry
 Outline of geoengineering
 Outline of mining
 Outline of nuclear technology
 Outline of water
 Outline of watersheds

Tables

 Table of biofuel crop yields
 Table of historic and prehistoric climate indicators
 Tables of European biogas utilisation

Timelines

 Carbon capture and storage (timeline)
 Central Plains Water Enhancement Scheme Timeline
 Timeline of the 1990 Pacific hurricane season
 Timeline of the 1992 Pacific hurricane season
 Timeline of the 1997 Pacific hurricane season
 Timeline of the 2002 Pacific hurricane season
 Timeline of the 2004 Pacific hurricane season
 Timeline of the 2005 Pacific hurricane season
 Timeline of the 2006 Pacific hurricane season
 Timeline of the 2007 Pacific hurricane season
 Timeline of the 2008 Pacific hurricane season
 Timeline of the 2009 Pacific hurricane season
 Timeline of the 2011 Pacific hurricane season
 Timeline of the 2012 Pacific hurricane season
 Timeline of alcohol fuel
 Timeline of the Deepwater Horizon oil spill
 Timeline of the Deepwater Horizon oil spill (May 2010)
 Timeline of the Deepwater Horizon oil spill (June 2010)
 Timeline of the Deepwater Horizon oil spill (July 2010)
 Timeline of the Deepwater Horizon oil spill (August 2010)
 Timeline of environmental events
 Timeline of environmental history
 Timeline of the Fukushima Daiichi nuclear disaster
 Timeline of the Fukushima Daini nuclear accidents
 Timeline of genetically modified organisms
 Timeline of history of environmentalism
 Timeline of major U.S. environmental and occupational health regulation
 Timeline of Minamata disease
 Timeline of the New Zealand environment
 Timeline of nuclear weapons development
 Timeline of relief efforts after the 2010 Chile earthquake
 Timeline of relief efforts after the 2010 Haiti earthquake

External lists 
 Endemic Bird Areas of the World: Priorities for Biodiversity Conservation (book)
 Hazardous Waste and Substances Sites List
 National Priorities List
 Toxic 100

See also

 Blacksmith Institute (see annual reports listing top problems)
 Environmental groups and resources serving K–12 schools
 Global 200 (list of ecoregions identified by the World Wildlife Fund [WWF] as priorities for conservation)
 The World's 25 Most Endangered Primates
 The World's 100 Most Threatened Species